Aiubkhan and Yakub Magomadov are two brothers from Kurchaloy, Chechnya, who have disappeared in respectively 2000 and 2004. 

Amnesty International fears that the "disappearance" of Yakub, may be connected to his efforts to find his younger brother, detained by the Russian federal forces in his home on October 2, 2000, and not been seen since. The family searched for him throughout the Russian Federation, eventually lodging a complaint with the European Court of Human Rights in 2001. Yakub told AI delegates in March 2004 about his brother's "disappearance" and the intimidation his family faced after their complaint to the ECHR. His family last saw him in April 2004, when he left Chechnya to travel to Moscow. In September 2005 AI learned that Yakub Magomadov had reportedly been seen alive in August 2005 in detention at the Russian federal forces headquarters at Khankala, where he may be being held secretly and tortured. According to Memorial, two members of Kadyrovtsy (Chechen militia) brought a note from him to his family, saying they would help arrange freeing him for ransom.

In November 2005 their cases have been urged towards the European Court by Amnesty and the family of Yakub and Aiubkhan. On June 12, 2007, the ECHR has found the state of Russia guilty of disappearance and presumed death of Ayubkhan Magomadov in its judgement in the case of Magomadov and Magomadov v. Russia. At the same time, the Court has not found that his brother Yakub's disappearance in 2004 had anything to do with his filing a complaint to the European Court.

See also
Forced disappearance
List of people who disappeared

References

External links
Magomadov & Magomadov v Russia
Human rights violations in the Chechen Republic: the Committee of Ministers’ responsibility vis-à-vis the Assembly’s concerns, Council of Europe, 21 December 2005
Russian Federation: What justice for Chechnya’s disappeared?, Amnesty International, July 2007

2000s missing person cases
Brothers
Chechen murder victims
Chechen people
Chechen victims of human rights abuses
Missing people
Missing person cases in Russia 
People murdered in Russia
People of the Chechen wars
Prisoners who died in Russian detention
Victims of human rights abuses
War crimes of the Second Chechen War